The Luxembourg Handball Federation (FLH) is the administrative and controlling body for handball and beach handball in Grand Duchy of Luxembourg. Founded in 1946, FLH is a founder member of both the European Handball Federation (EHF) and the International Handball Federation (IHF).

National teams
 Luxembourg men's national handball team
 Luxembourg men's national junior handball team
 Luxembourg women's national handball team

Competitions
 Luxembourg Men's National Division
 Luxembourg Women's National Division

References

External links
 Official website  
 Luxembourg at the IHF website.
 Luxembourg at the EHF website.

Handball in Luxembourg
Handball
Sports organizations established in 1946
1946 establishments in Luxembourg
Handball governing bodies
European Handball Federation
National members of the International Handball Federation